Trinidad and Tobago will compete at the 2011 Pan American Games in Guadalajara, Mexico from October 14 to 30, 2011. Trinidad and Tobago will send 78 athletes in 14 sports.

Medalists

Athletics

Trinidad and Tobago has qualified 13 athletes.

Men
Track and road events

Field events

Women
Track and road events

Field events

Beach volleyball

Trinidad and Tobago has qualified a women's team.

Boxing

Trinidad and Tobago has qualified one male boxer.

Men

Canoeing

Trinidad and Tobago has qualified one male athlete.

Men

Cycling

Trinidad and Tobago has qualified two cyclists.

Road Cycling

Men

Track cycling

Sprints & Pursuit

Field hockey

Trinidad and Tobago has qualified a men's and women's field hockey team.
Each team will be made up of sixteen athletes for a total of thirty-two.

Men
Team

Karlos Stephen
Justin Pascal
Darren Cowie
Kwandwane Browne
Aidan De Gannes
Mickell Pierre
Dwain Quan Chan
Akim Toussaint
Atiba Whittington
Christopher Scipio
Alan Henderson
Andrew Vieira
Shaquille Daniel
Nicholas Grant
Solomon Eccles
Evan Piers Farrell

Elimination stage

Crossover

Seventh place match

Women
Team

Petal Derry
Fiona O'Brien
Michelle Leotaud
Alanna Lewis
Stephanie Whiteman
Curlyne Wynn
Lindsay Williams
Kristin Thompson
Avion Ashton
Blair Wynne
Alicia Waithe
Brittney Hingh
Charlene Williams
Tamara De Nobriga
Arielle DuQuensnay
Kelli O'Brien

Elimination stage

Crossover

Seventh place match

Football

Trinidad and Tobago has qualified a men's and women's football team. The team will be made up of 18 athletes.

Men

Sheldon Bateau
Trevin Casear
Zane Coker
Kaydion Gabriel
Jamal Gay
Joevin Jones
Jayson Joseph
Marcus Joseph
Micah Lewis
Andre Marchan
Kevin Molino
Kareem Moses
Cameron Roget
Leslie Russell
Aquil Selby
Jeromie Williams
Mekeil Williams
Shahdon Winchester

Men's team will participate in Group A of the football tournament.

Women
Team

Kimika Forbes
Shalette Alexander
Karyn Forbes
Tiana Bateau
Arin King
Danielle Blair
Maylee Attin-Johnson
Anastasia Prescott
Victoria Swift
Candice Edwards
Kenya Cordner
Lauryn Hutchinson
Rhea Belgrave
Tasha St. Louis
Nadia James
Ahkeela Malloon
Dernelle Mascall
Janine Françoise

Group A

Gymnastics

Artistic
Trinidad and Tobago has qualified a team of 1 woman.

Women
Individual qualification & Team Finals

Individual Finals

Karate

Trinidad and Tobago has qualified one male karate athlete.

Sailing

Trinidad and Tobago has qualified one sailor.

Men

Shooting

Trinidad and Tobago has qualified two shooters.

Men

Table tennis

Trinidad and Tobago has qualified one male and one female athlete in table tennis.

Men

Women

Taekwondo

Trinidad and Tobago has qualified one athlete.

Men

References

Nations at the 2011 Pan American Games
P
2011